Lakeland is primarily a toponym.  It may refer to:

Places

Australia 
Lakeland, Queensland

Canada 
Lakeland (electoral district), a federal electoral district in Alberta
Lakeland County, a former municipal district in Alberta
District of Lakeland No. 521, Saskatchewan, a rural municipality
Lakeland Provincial Park and Recreation Area, Canada

Finland 
Finnish Lakeland, a landscape region

Turkey 
Turkish Lakeland, an area of south west Anatolia

United Kingdom 
English Lakeland, an alternative name for the Lake District, a mountainous area in north west England
South Lakeland, a local government district
Lakeland Wildlife Oasis, a small zoological collection near the town of Milnthorpe, Cumbria, England

United States 
Lakeland, Baltimore
Lakeland, Florida
 Lakeland Civic Center
Lakeland, Georgia
Lakeland, Indiana
Lakeland, Kentucky
Lakeland, Louisiana
Lakeland, Michigan
Lakeland, Minnesota
Lakeland, Missouri
Lakeland, New Jersey
Lakeland, New York
Lakeland, Suffolk County, New York
Lakeland, Tennessee
Lakeland, Wisconsin
Lakeland North, Washington
Lakeland South, Washington
Lakeland Village, California
Metro Lakeland, a name that was coined in the 1960s for an area of southern Illinois

Lakeland may also refer to:

People 
Christine Lakeland (born 1954), American musician/songwriter
Paul Lakeland, American theologian
William Lakeland (1847–1922), Australian explorer and prospector

Schools
Lakeland Elementary School (disambiguation)
Lakeland High School (disambiguation)
Lakeland College (disambiguation)
Lakeland Christian Academy (disambiguation)
Lakeland Christian School, a private school located in Lakeland, Florida

Art and entertainment
Lakeland: Journeys into the Soul of Canada, a 2009 award-winning book by Canadian author, Allan Casey

Other uses
Lakeland limequat, a cultivar of limequat
Lakeland Terrier, a dog breed
Lakeland (company), a kitchenware company in the United Kingdom
Lakeland Baptist Church, a Southern Baptist congregation located in Lewisville, Texas
Lakeland Classic, a golf tournament on the Nationwide Tour from 1997 to 2000

See also 
Lakelands (disambiguation)